Boynewood is a locality in the North Burnett Region, Queensland, Australia.

Geography 
The locality is bounded to the north by the Burnett River and to the west and south by its tributary the Boyne River.

The Mundubbera Durong Road (State Route 75) passes through the locality from the north-east (Mundubbera) to the south-west (Derri Derra).

The principal land use is crop farming and orchards.

History 
Boynewood State School opened on 2 February 1915.

All Saints' Anglican church opened circa 1920. It closed circa 1989.

Education 
Boynewood State School is a government primary (Prep-6) school for boys and girls at 1138 Durong Road. In 2017, the school had an enrolment of 29 students with  3 teachers (2 full-time equivalent) and 5 non-teaching staff (2 full-time equivalent).

References 

North Burnett Region
Localities in Queensland